Carretto is a surname. Notable people with this surname include:

 Carlo Carretto (1910–1988), Italian religious author of the Catholic congregation of the Little Brothers of the Gospel.
 Luca Carretto (born 1984), Italian footballer

See also 
 Del Carretto